Triptych (Strings Percussion Celesta) is a ballet made by Christopher d'Amboise to Bartók's Music for Strings, Percussion and Celesta, as part of New York City Ballet's Diamond Project. The premiere took place on Wednesday, 7 June 2000 at the New York State Theater, Lincoln Center.

Original cast  
Wendy Whelan
Kristin Sloan
Jock Soto
Albert Evans

Reviews  
NY Times by Anna Kisselgoff, 9 June 2000 
Dance Magazine by Doris Hering, October 2000 
 NY Magazine by Tobi Tobias, 3 July 2000

 

Ballets by Christopher d'Amboise
Ballets to the music of Béla Bartók
2000 ballet premieres
New York City Ballet repertory
New York City Ballet Diamond Project